Bystry (masculine), Bystraya (feminine), or Bystroye (neuter) is the name of several inhabited localities in Russia:
Bystry, Chukotka Autonomous Okrug, an urban locality (urban-type settlement) in Chukotka Autonomous Okrug; currently in the process of being liquidated
Bystry, name of several rural localities
Bystraya, Oryol Oblast, a rural locality (a village) in Oryol Oblast
Bystraya, Tyumen Oblast, a rural locality (a village) in Tyumen Oblast
Bystroye, Kaluga Oblast, a rural locality (a selo) in Kaluga Oblast
Bystroye, name of several other rural localities